The 1954 United States Senate elections in Wyoming took place on November 2, 1954. Incumbent Democratic Senator Lester C. Hunt died from suicide on June 19, 1954, and Republican Governor Clifford J. Rogers appointed former state highway commissioner Edward D. Crippa to replace him. Two elections for the Senate seat were held on the same day; one as a special election to fill the remainder of Hunt's original six-year term, and another to select a Senator to serve the next six-year term. Senator Crippa did not run for re-election.

Crippa did not run for re-election; instead, Congressman William Henry Harrison III won a contested Republican primary and advanced to the general election, where he faced former Senator Joseph C. O'Mahoney, the Democratic nominee. In the midst of a largely neutral political environment—Democrats gained a handful of seats in Congress nationwide, which enabled them to flip the Senate, while Republican Milward Simpson narrowly won the gubernatorial election—O'Mahoney narrowly defeated Harrison to return to the Senate.

As of 2022, this is the last time Democrats won Wyoming's Class 2 Senate seat.

Democratic primary

Candidates
 Joseph C. O'Mahoney, incumbent U.S. Senator
 Carl A. Johnson (only filed for the special election)

Results

Regular election

Special election

Republican Primary

Candidates
 William Henry Harrison III, U.S. Congressman from Wyoming's at-large congressional district
 Sam C. Hyatt, former President of the American National Cattlemen's Association 
 Ewing T. Kerr, former Chairman of the Republican Party of Wyoming 
 William J. Taber, auto dealer

Results

Regular election

Special election

General election

Results

Regular election

Special election

References

United States Senate elections in Wyoming
Wyoming
United States Senate
Wyoming 1954
Wyoming 1954
United States Senate 1954